Vallone is a surname. Notable people with the surname include:

Charles J. Vallone (1901–1967), Italian American judge
Eleonora Vallone (born 1955), Italian actress and model
John Vallone (1953–2004), American production designer and art director
Paul Vallone, American politician
Peter Vallone Jr. (born 1961), American lawyer and politician
Peter Vallone Sr. (born 1934), American politician
Raf Vallone (1916–2002), Italian footballer and actor